Ceryx albimacula is a moth of the subfamily Arctiinae. It was described by Francis Walker in 1854. It is found in Cameroon, the Republic of the Congo, the Democratic Republic of the Congo, Equatorial Guinea, Gabon, Ghana, Ivory Coast, Nigeria and Sierra Leone.

References

Ceryx (moth)
Moths described in 1854
Moths of Africa